Hassingham is a small village in the county of Norfolk, England, about ten miles east of Norwich. The village population is included in the civil parish of Strumpshaw.

The villages name means 'Homestead/village of Hasu's people'.

Its church, St Mary, is one of 124 existing round-tower churches in Norfolk. The best-known former incumbent of Hassingham is the Rev. William Haslam, a nineteenth-Century evangelical, better known as the Vicar who was converted by his own sermon. Haslam held the living, together with that of nearby Buckenham from 1863 to 1871, having been presented to the living by Sir Thomas Beauchamp of Langley Hall. During Haslam's ministry in Hassingham, it was said that most of the population of this small village professed evangelical conversion. Haslam was supported by his wife and the preacher Catherine Hooper who they had met in Bath.

Rail access
The nearest station is Buckenham railway station on the Wherry Line.

Notes

http://kepn.nottingham.ac.uk/map/place/Norfolk/Hassingham

External links

St Mary's on the European Round Tower Churches Website

Villages in Norfolk
Broadland